Uche Jombo Rodriguez (born December 28, 1979), is a Nigerian actress, screenwriter and film producer.

Early life 
Uche Jombo was born on December 28, 1979, in Abiriba, Abia State, Nigeria. She is a graduate of Mathematics and Statistics from the University of Calabar and Computer Programming from the Federal University of Technology Minna. She was once married to an American named Kenny.

Career 
Uche Jombo ventured into the Nigerian movie industry in 1999 in the movie Visa to Hell. As a screenwriter she has written and co-written several movies some of which include: The Celebrity, Games Men Play, Girls in the Hood & A Time to Love. Jombo went on to produce films such as Nollywood Hustlers, Holding Hope and her work Damage which deals with the issue of domestic violence. Jombo is an ambassador for Globacom.

Over 200 Nollywood film(s) added credit to her name, sometimes credited as Uche Jumbo. Her 20 screen play credits of Nollywood classics include Games Men Play, Lies Men Tell, Holding Hope, A Mother's Fight, Unconditional, A Time to Love, Be My Wife, and Celebrity.

In 2008, she started executive production of her own films through her Uche Jombo studio's production company. In 2012, she married Kenny Rodriguez and proceeded to directing in 2015 after the birth of her son Matthew. Her directing credits includes Lost in Us, How I Saved My Marriage, and the nollywood box office, true-life drama and Heaven on My Mind.

She was among the several celebrities like Omoni Oboli, Laura Ikeji and some more, to launch GrandLux Cafe located in Lekki on the 30th of November 2018.

Filmography

Accolades

References

External links 
 

Living people
Actresses from Abia State
Nigerian film directors
20th-century Nigerian actresses
21st-century Nigerian actresses
University of Calabar alumni
1979 births
Federal University of Technology, Minna alumni
Nigerian film producers
Igbo actresses
Nigerian screenwriters
Nigerian television personalities